John Heywood Hawkins (21 May 1802 – 27 June 1877) was a British politician and barrister.

The son of John Hawkins, Hawkins largely grew up at Bignor Park in West Sussex.  Hawkins was educated at Eton College, and then at Trinity College, Cambridge, qualifying as a barrister.  He had a keen interest in architecture and landscape gardening.

Hawkins was the nephew of Christopher Hawkins, who controlled the rotten borough of Mitchell in Cornwall.  At the 1830 UK general election, John was elected in Mitchell, but unlike his uncle, he was a Whig, and supported the Great Reform Act.

Hawkins lost the Mitchell seat at the 1831 UK general election, but government ministers were keen to retain him, and he won Tavistock a few weeks later.  He supported the Reform Act 1832, although he opposed the enfranchisement of tenants who paid at least £50 in annual rent.  At the 1832 UK general election, he switched to contest Newport (Isle of Wight).  He held the seat until 1841, when he stood down.

References

1802 births
1877 deaths
Alumni of Trinity College, Cambridge
People educated at Eton College
UK MPs 1830–1831
UK MPs 1831–1832
UK MPs 1835–1837
UK MPs 1837–1841
Whig (British political party) MPs for English constituencies
Members of the Parliament of the United Kingdom for Mitchell
Members of the Parliament of the United Kingdom for Tavistock
English barristers